Readbourne is a historic home located at Centreville, Queen Anne's County, Maryland, United States. It is a five-part Georgian brick house: the center block was built in the early 1730s; the south wing in 1791; and the north wing in 1948. All of the brick walls are laid in Flemish bond.

It was listed on the National Register of Historic Places in 1973. It was once owned by William Fahnestock Jr. of the New York banking family.

References

External links
, including photo from 1971, at Maryland Historical Trust

Houses on the National Register of Historic Places in Maryland
Houses in Queen Anne's County, Maryland
Houses completed in 1791
Georgian architecture in Maryland
Historic American Buildings Survey in Maryland
National Register of Historic Places in Queen Anne's County, Maryland